"Choosey Lover" is a 1983 soul song by The Isley Brothers (Originally titled "Juicy Lover"). Released on their T-Neck imprint, the song was their second consecutive top ten R&B hit after their seminal "Between the Sheets" hit No. 3 on that chart. It was the second of two chart-topping singles the Isleys released off their aptly titled Between the Sheets album. "Choosey Lover" was also the last charting single to feature the 3 + 3 lineup of the band. A year later, younger brothers Ernie Isley (who played the memorable guitar solos on the song and co-wrote the lyrics), Marvin Isley and their brother-in-law Chris Jasper left to form Isley-Jasper-Isley while older brothers Ronald Isley, Rudolph Isley and O'Kelly Isley continued on under the "Isley Brothers" name.

The song has similarities to the Earth, Wind & Fire song "Devotion". The song was covered by R&B singer Aaliyah as "Choosey Lover (Old School/New School)" on her 1996 album One in a Million, with the "Old School" section very closely resembling the original before transitioning into the "New School" section, which features more of a hip hop beat and feel to match the contemporary feel of the rest of the album. The song was sampled and redone to make "Buddah Lovaz", a song dedicated to marijuana, by Bone Thugs-n-Harmony and the remix to "Street Dreams" by Nas featuring R. Kelly. The song also has elements which have been used in Keith Sweat's "Nobody" and his 2002 single, One on One.

Personnel
Ronald Isley – lead vocals, background vocals
Ernie Isley – guitar, drum machine programming, background vocals
Marvin Isley – bass guitar, background vocals
Chris Jasper – keyboards, piano, synthesizers, background vocals
Rudolph Isley – background vocals
O'Kelly Isley, Jr. – background vocals
Produced, written, arranged and composed by The Isley Brothers and Chris Jasper

Charts

References

External links
 Choosey Lover - List of Releases at Discogs

1983 singles
Contemporary R&B ballads
Pop ballads
The Isley Brothers songs
Songs written by Chris Jasper
1983 songs
Aaliyah songs
T-Neck Records singles
1980s ballads
Songs written by Ernie Isley
Songs written by Marvin Isley
Songs written by Rudolph Isley
Songs written by O'Kelly Isley Jr.
Songs written by Ronald Isley